The Tusket River is a Canadian river located in Nova Scotia's Yarmouth County.

Geography
The Tusket River is a major river system and drainage basin in Yarmouth County in south-western Nova Scotia. It has numerous branches and associated rivers, and also flows through a series of lakes. Near its mouth, the river becomes a tidal estuary, with the water becoming brackish due to mixing of the river's fresh water with salt brought upstream from the Gulf of Maine by incoming tides.

The headwaters of the river lie in the Tobeatic Wilderness Area, which is part of the larger Southwest Nova Biosphere Reserve.

Natural history

Flora
The river is nationally significant for its many coastal plain plant species. Some, like the Plymouth Gentian (Sabatia kennedyana) and Pink Coreopsis (Coreopsis rosea) occur nowhere else in Canada. These species occur on gently-sloping sand and gravel shorelines lower in the watershed. There is an online guide to assist with identifying all these species. Wilson's Lake has one of the largest populations of Atlantic Coastal Plain plants in Canada, and is the site of the small but highly significant Tusket River Nature Reserve. In 2011 botanists exploring a newly acquired protected area, the Jack and Darlene Stone Conservation Lands, discovered another rare plant species, Maleberry (Lyonia ligustrina), the first time this species has been found growing in Canada.

Groundseltree (Baccharis halimifolia) reaches its northern limit in North America near the Tusket River Estuary. This white-flowering shrub in the aster family ranges southward along the Atlantic Coastal Plain and Gulf Coastal Plain coastal plain to Florida and Texas.

Fish
Sport fishing in the Tusket River is very popular. The upper reaches, served by Trout Point lodge, were named one of the top 10 fishing spots in the world by The Guardian in 2006.

There is a commercial "river herring" fishery in the river (alewife and blueback herring), which employs dip nets and fixed gill nets.

Communities
Communities located along the Tusket River, from northeast to southwest, include:

East Kemptville
North Kemptville
Kemptville
East Quinan
Quinan
Canaan
South Canaan
Springhaven
Gavelton
Tusket Falls
Tusket
Pleasant Lake
Hubbard's Point
Amirault's Hill
Plymouth
Sluice Point
Upper Wedgeport
Wedgeport
Lower Wedgeport

See also
List of rivers of Nova Scotia

References

External links
Public Lands Coalition - Tusket River
Map of the Tusket River

Rivers of Nova Scotia
Landforms of Yarmouth County